53 Cancri is a variable star in the zodiac constellation Cancer, located around 960 light years from the Sun. It has the variable star designation BO Cancri; 53 Cancri is the Flamsteed designation. This object is a challenge to view with the naked eye, having an apparent visual magnitude around 6.  It is around 960 light years away.

The star is moving further away from the Earth with a heliocentric radial velocity of +14 km/s. 53 Cancri is an aging red giant on the asymptotic giant branch and has a stellar classification of M3 III.

53 Cancri is a semiregular variable that varies between magnitude 5.9 and 6.4 with a period of 27 days.  There is a suspected second period of 270 days.

References

M-type giants
Semiregular variable stars
Cancer (constellation)
Durchmusterung objects
Cancri, 53
075716
3521
043575
Cancri, BO